SS Vedic was an ocean liner for the White Star Line, built in 1917 by Harland and Wolff. She was immediately requisitioned as a troopship before she could begin passenger service due to the ongoing conflicts of World War One, for which she was extensively refitted. 

On September 19, 1919, while returning British troops home from Russia, Vedic managed to run aground near North Ronaldsay in the Orkney Islands, Scotland. Vedic was helped back to deep water by warships and tug boats.

After the War, in 1920, Vedic saw passenger service as intended. She was once again refitted as an ocean liner, and immediately after travelled the Canada-to-Liverpool immigrant route. She took the Liverpool-Australia route in 1925.

In 1934, the White Star Line merged with its chief rival, Cunard Line, forming Cunard-White Star, Ltd. The newly formed company decided that the vessel was too old and needed to be retired from service. She was one of the first ships that Cunard-White Star sent to the breakers. She was sold for scrap in 1934.

References

 - Total pages: 175 

1917 ships
Ocean liners of the United Kingdom
Troop ships
Ships built by Harland and Wolff
Ships built in Belfast